The Battle at Elderbush Gulch (also known as The Battle of Elderbush Gulch) is a 1913 American silent Western film directed by D. W. Griffith and featuring Mae Marsh, Lillian Gish, and Alfred Paget.

Plot
Orphans Sally (Mae Marsh) and her little sister are sent to live with their uncle in the west. Among other baggage, they bring their two puppies. Melissa (Lillian Gish) is in the same stagecoach with husband and newborn baby. The uncles find the little girls amusing but tell them that the dogs must stay outside. Meanwhile, a nearby tribe of Native Americans is having a tribal dance. The puppies, left outside in a basket, run off. Sally, worried about the dogs, goes outside and discovers they are gone. She follows their trail and runs into the tribal chief and his son who have captured them for food. There is a scuffle but her uncles arrive and intervene. Gunfire ensues and one of the Native Americans is left dead. The other returns to the tribe to inform them and aroused by "hatred to revenge" they go into a war dance.

Meanwhile, a tearful Sally has persuaded a friendly hand to build a secret door in the cabin so she can bring the puppies inside at night. The Native Americans attack the village and the frightened settlers run off toward the lonely cabin. In the melee, the baby is separated from its father. The Natives attack the cabin just after a scout rides off to alert the fort.

The Native Americans ride in circles around the cabin while the settlers try to fight them off. Melissa, in the cabin, is distraught worrying about the fate of her baby. Sally, seeing the baby through a peephole, sneaks out her secret door and finds the baby in the arms of a dead towns person. In a hectic battle scene, she brings the baby back through the secret door.

The settlers are running out of ammunition and the people in the cabin are in chaos. The Native Americans, crawling on their stomachs, almost reach the cabin, but then the cavalry arrives. The Native Americans are quickly dispatched and all is well but for Melissa's grief over her missing baby. Sally pops out of a chest holding baby and puppies. The uncle agrees to let Sally keep the puppies inside.

Cast

 Mae Marsh – Sally
 Leslie Loveridge – The Waif
 Alfred Paget – Waifs' uncle
 Robert Harron – The father
 Lillian Gish – Mellisa Harlow
 Charles Hill Mailes – Ranch owner
 William A. Carroll – The Mexican
 Frank Opperman – Indian Chief
 Henry B. Walthall – Indian Chief's son
 Joseph McDermott – Waifs' guardian
 Jennie Lee – Waifs' guardian
 Lionel Barrymore
 Elmer Booth
 Kate Bruce – Settler
 Harry Carey
 Charles Gorman – Among the Indians
 Dell Henderson
 Elmo Lincoln – Cavalryman
 W. Chrystie Miller – Settler
 W. C. Robinson – Among the Indians
 Blanche Sweet

Criticism 
The movie has been criticized for being racist, adhering to white supremacy ideology and depicting and portraying Native Americans as primitive, ruthless, aggressive, hostile, barbaric and wild. The movie provides a negative and violent image of Native Americans in favor of white settlers.

See also
 List of American films of 1913
 Harry Carey filmography
 D. W. Griffith filmography
 Lillian Gish filmography
 Blanche Sweet filmography
 Lionel Barrymore filmography

References

External links
 
 
 The Battle of Elderbush Gulch – MOTOGRAPHY July 31, 1915
 The Battle at Elderbush Gulch Movie Poster
 MoMA | D. W. Griffith's The Battle at Elderbush Gulch and John Ford's Straight Shooting

1913 films
1913 Western (genre) films
1913 short films
American black-and-white films
American silent short films
Articles containing video clips
Biograph Company films
Films about Native Americans
Films about race and ethnicity
Films directed by D. W. Griffith
Silent American Western (genre) films
1910s American films
1910s English-language films